Smartdust is a system of many tiny microelectromechanical systems (MEMS) such as sensors, robots, or other devices, that can detect, for example, light, temperature, vibration, magnetism, or chemicals. They are usually operated on a computer network wirelessly and are distributed over some area to perform tasks, usually sensing through radio-frequency identification. Without an antenna of much greater size the range of tiny smart dust communication devices is measured in a few millimeters and they may be vulnerable to electromagnetic disablement and destruction by microwave exposure.

Design and engineering
The concepts for Smart Dust emerged from a workshop at RAND in 1992 and a series of DARPA ISAT studies in the mid-1990s due to the potential military applications of the technology. The work was strongly influenced by work at UCLA and the University of Michigan during that period, as well as science fiction authors Stanislaw Lem (in novels The Invincible in 1964 and Peace on Earth in 1985), Neal Stephenson and Vernor Vinge. The first public presentation of the concept by that name was at the American Vacuum Society meeting in Anaheim in 1996.

A Smart Dust research proposal was presented to DARPA written by Kristofer S. J. Pister, Joe Kahn, and Bernhard Boser, all from the University of California, Berkeley, in 1997. The proposal, to build wireless sensor nodes with a volume of one cubic millimeter, was selected for funding in 1998. The project led to a working mote smaller than a grain of rice, and larger "COTS Dust" devices kicked off the TinyOS effort at Berkeley.

The concept was later expanded upon by Kris Pister in 2001. A recent review discusses various techniques to take smartdust in sensor networks beyond millimeter dimensions to the micrometre level.

The Ultra-Fast Systems component of the Nanoelectronics Research Centre at the University of Glasgow is a founding member of a large international consortium which is developing a related concept: smart specks.

Smart Dust entered the Gartner Hype Cycle on Emerging Technologies in 2003, and returned in 2013 as the most speculative entrant.

In 2022, a Nature paper written by Shyamnath Gollakota, Vikram Iyer, Hans Gaensbauer and Thomas Daniel, all from the University of Washington, presented tiny light-weight programmable battery-free wireless sensors that can be dispersed in the wind. These devices were inspired by Dandelion seeds that can travel as far as a kilometer in dry, windy, and warm conditions.

Examples
Dust Networks started a project exploring the application of Smartdust, which included:

 Defense-related sensor networks such as battlefield surveillance, treaty monitoring, transportation monitoring, and scud hunting.

 Virtual keyboard sensors: by attaching miniature remotes on each fingernail, accelerometers could then sense the orientation and motion of each fingertip, and communicate this data to a computer in a wristwatch.
 Inventory control: by placing miniature sensors on each object in the inventory system (product package, carton, pallet, truck warehouse, internet), each component could "talk" to the next component in the system. This evolved into today's RFID inventory control systems.
 Product quality monitoring: temperature and humidity monitoring of perishables such as meat, produce, and dairy.
 Impact, vibration and temperature monitoring of consumer electronics, for failure analysis and diagnostic information, e.g. monitoring the vibration of bearings to detect frequency signatures that may indicate imminent failure.

See also
 A Deepness in the Sky
 Claytronics
 Dust Networks, Inc.
 Grey goo
 Mesh networking
 Nanotechnology
 Neural dust
 Prey (novel), a 2002 science fiction thriller by Michael Crichton about nanorobots which attack in swarms.
 Programmable matter
 RFID
 Self-reconfiguring modular robotics
The Diamond Age, a 1995 science fiction novel by Neal Stephenson that mentions the use of dust for surveillance.
The Invincible, a 1964 science fiction novel with intrigue centered on self-configuring microrobotic swarms.
 Smart camera
 Smart camera network
 TinyOS
 Ubiquitous computing
 Unconventional computing
 Utility fog
 Wireless sensor network

References

External links
How stuff works: motes
Open source mote designs and TinyOS operating system from UC Berkeley
 Rethinking The Internet of Things Nature driven view of M2M cloud communications based on lightweight chirp devices.
UC Berkeley Smart Dust Project
Info about smart dust communications
Sailor research group at UCSD
SpeckNet research groups based in Scotland
Web of Sensors "In the wilds of the San Jacinto Mountains, along a steep canyon, scientists are turning 30 acres [121,000 m2] of pines and hardwoods in California into a futuristic vision of environmental study. They are linking up more than 100 tiny sensors, robots, cameras and computers, which are beginning to paint an unusually detailed portrait of this lush world, home to more than 30 rare and endangered species. Much of the instrumentation is wireless. Devices the size of a deck of cards — known as motes, after dust motes..."
Technologies to watch: motes
Molecular shuttle power: Smart dust biosensors may be smaller than a grain of sand but they have big potential – an Instant Insight from the Royal Society of Chemistry
http://www.betabatt.com/ Betavoltaic batteries from 2.5 micrometre cubed upwards, 10 to 30-year lifespan.

Wireless sensor network
Sensors
Smart materials
Microtechnology
Microelectronic and microelectromechanical systems
Artificial materials